The Chevrolet Orlando is a three-row compact MPV manufactured by General Motors under the Chevrolet brand since 2011. The first-generation model was mainly developed and manufactured by GM Korea, while also assembled in four other countries. Its main markets were South Korea, Europe, Canada, Latin America, and several other Asian countries. It was not marketed in the United States.

The second-generation model launched in 2018 is solely built and sold in China by SAIC-GM joint venture, sharing the same platform with the Buick GL6. It also marked the end of Orlando production in South Korea.



First generation (J309; 2010)

Concept 

The Orlando concept was unveiled at the 2008 Paris Motor Show and later at the 2009 North American International Auto Show. It was said to be a 5-door, 7-seat vehicle based on Chevrolet Cruze sedan.

In 2010, GM showed the GMC Granite small MPV concept, which is similar to the Orlando.

Production model 

In August 2009, at its extended product review, GM previewed the production-spec Orlando and confirmed its production.

The production model was unveiled at the 2010 Busan International Motor Show, followed by the 2010 Paris Motor Show, and the 2013 North American International Auto Show. Production began at the Gunsan assembly plant in South Korea in October 2010. It was sold in South Korea from February 2011, marketed as an "Active Life Vehicle" (ALV), claimed to be the first of its kind.

It is based on the GM Delta II platform mainly used for C-segment vehicles, and closely related with the first-generation Chevrolet Cruze and the third-generation Opel Zafira. Despite being marketed as an MPV, it is designed with a rugged styling similar to crossovers with plastic wheel arches and a boxy stance.

While GM had initially intended to market the Orlando in the United States, they reversed their decision in May 2010. The Chevrolet Orlando was sold in Canada starting in mid-2011 for the 2012 model year. The Orlando was discontinued there for the 2015 model year.

The European model was available from 2011 until 2014 when most of Chevrolet's vehicles, except muscle and sports cars were permanently withdrawn from the European market, except Russia and CIS member nations. Later in 2015, the Chevrolet Orlando was discontinued in the Russian market.

The diesel engine for the Korean market was updated in 2015 to meet the government's Euro 6 requirement. All diesel Chevrolet Orlandos sold in Korea were equipped with a 1.6-litre inline-four CDTi engine outsourced from Opel.

Worldwide production of the first generation Orlando ended in 2018, following its discontinuation by GM Uzbekistan and the closure of the Gunsan plant in South Korea which produced it.

Engines 

Canadian models included 2.4-litre direct injection petrol four-cylinder engine. European models include 1.8-litre petrol, 2.0-litre diesel engines. South Korean models include 2.0-litre LPG and 2.0-litre (163PS) diesel engines before update to 1.6-litre Opel diesel in 2015.

Safety

Marketing 
As part of the Chevrolet Orlando launch in the UK, a life-sized Play-Doh clay model replica was unveiled in London in 2011.

Second generation (2018) 

The second generation Orlando is solely made and sold in China, manufactured by SAIC-GM. It is available in 5- and 7-seater versions.

Sales

References

External links 

 
 
 Press kit: Chevrolet Orlando Europe, UK
 Chevrolet Orlando Technical Specification Data (2010–2011 Europe)

Orlando
Orlando
Compact MPVs
Euro NCAP small MPVs
GM Korea vehicles
Cars introduced in 2011
2010s cars